This list is of the Intangible Cultural Properties of Japan in the Prefecture of Aomori.

National Cultural Properties
As of 1 February 2015, zero Important Intangible Cultural Properties have been designated.

Prefectural Cultural Properties
As of 19 December 2014, two properties have been designated at a prefectural level.

Municipal Cultural Properties
As of 1 May 2014, two properties have been designated at a municipal level.

See also
 Cultural Properties of Japan
 Tsugaru-jamisen
 Aomori Nebuta Matsuri

References

External links
  Cultural Properties in Aomori Prefecture

Culture in Aomori Prefecture
Aomori